Donald Ball (born 14 June 1962) is an English former footballer who made 60 appearances in the Football League playing as a central defender for Darlington between 1979 and 1982. He also played non-league football for clubs including Bishop Auckland.

References

1962 births
Living people
People from Barnard Castle
Footballers from County Durham
English footballers
Association football defenders
Darlington F.C. players
Bishop Auckland F.C. players
English Football League players